The 2017–18 North Dakota Fighting Hawks men's basketball team represented the University of North Dakota during the 2017–18 NCAA Division I men's basketball season. The Fighting Hawks, led by 12th-year head coach Brian Jones, played their home games at the Betty Engelstad Sioux Center in Grand Forks, North Dakota as members of the Big Sky Conference. They finished the season 12–20, 6–12 in Big Sky play to finish in a tie for eighth place. They defeated Montana State in the first round of the Big Sky tournament before losing in the quarterfinals to Montana.

This season was the last for North Dakota as a full Big Sky member. On July 1, 2018, the school will join the Summit League in all sports except for football, in which it will remain a Big Sky member before joining the Missouri Valley Football Conference in 2020.

Previous season
The Fighting Hawks finished the 2016–17 season 22–10, 14–4 in Big Sky play to win the Big Sky regular season championship. In the Big Sky tournament, they defeated Portland State, Idaho, and Weber State to win the tournament championship. As a result, they received the conference's automatic bid to the NCAA tournament and the school's first ever bid to the NCAA Tournament. As a No. 15 seed in the West region, they lost to No. 2-seeded and No. 4-ranked Arizona in the first round.

Offseason

Departures

Incoming transfers

2017 incoming recruits

Roster

Schedule and results

|-
!colspan=9 style=| Regular season

|-
!colspan=9 style=| Big Sky tournament

References

North Dakota Fighting Hawks men's basketball seasons
North Dakota
Fight
Fight